Laurenţiu Bălănoiu (born 16 July 1962) is a Romanian luger. He competed in the men's doubles event at the 1984 Winter Olympics.

References

External links
 

1962 births
Living people
Romanian male lugers
Olympic lugers of Romania
Lugers at the 1984 Winter Olympics
People from Sinaia